Maree Clarke is a Mutti Mutti, Yorta Yorta, BoonWurrung/Wemba Wemba woman living in Melbourne, known for her work as a curator and artist. Clarke is a multidisciplinary artist renowned for her work in reviving South-eastern Aboriginal Australian art practices.

Career 
Maree Clarke, a Mutti Mutti, Yorta Yorta, BoonWurrung/Wemba Wemba woman,  grew up in and around Mildura in North Western Victoria.

She began working as an educator in her home town in 1978, which provided her with a solid base from which to develop her career in promoting and supporting South-East Aboriginal histories, culture and knowledge. Along with her brother and sister, Clarke established Kiah Krafts, an Aboriginal arts enterprise, in Mildura.

She has lived in Melbourne since 1988.

The City of Port Phillip became the first Victorian local government to establish a centre dedicated to actively promoting Aboriginal arts and culture, creating the first Koori Arts Unit in St Kilda. Clark was the first Koori Arts Officer from 1994 to 1998, and instrumental in its success. In 1996, Clarke curated, with Kimba Thompson and Len Tregonning, the We Iri We Homeborn Aboriginal and Torres Strait Islander Arts Festival. Her collaborations with these two artists as well as Sonja Hodge can be seen in public artworks around the city of Melbourne.

Artistic career 
Clarke works across a range of mediums including photography, sculpture, painting and jewellery.

Research and revival of cultural practices which have been lost as a result of colonisation form an important part of Clarke's art practice. Clarke goes to museums to research and work with objects in their collections. Her work has seen her become a pivotal figure in the reclamation of cultural and artistic practices of South Eastern Australian Aboriginal peoples. Her work has included eel traps, kopis, possum skin cloak-making, and kangaroo tooth necklaces (Thung-ung Coorang). She is committed to preserving inter-generational memories of cultural practices.

Recognition 
Made from Memory (Nan’s house) (2017) was purchased by the National Gallery of Australia in 2017 in recognition of the 50th Anniversary of the 1967 Referendum.

In 2021 Clarke was the first living Aboriginal artist to be featured in a solo exhibition in the National Gallery of Victoria in Melbourne.

In 2022, a major retrospective of Clarke's works titled Ancestral Memories will be shown at the National Gallery of Victoria in Melbourne.

Works

Solo exhibitions
 2021 Ancestral Memories, National Gallery of Victoria, Melbourne
 2019 Eel Trap with Mitch Mahoney, Footscray Community Arts Centre, Footscray, Vic
 2019 Translating Culture with Mitch Mahoney, Canberra Glassworks, Kingston ACT
 2019 Ancestral Memory, Treasury Gallery Old Quad, University of Melbourne, Melbourne 
 2019 Reimagining Culture – Contemporary Connections to Culture, Mildura Arts Centre, Mildura
 2018 Reimagining Culture, Arts Space Wodonga, Wodonga 
 2015 Ritual: Connection to Country, Koorie Heritage Trust, Melbourne 
 2011 Ritual & Ceremony, Bunjilaka Gallery, Melbourne Museum, Melbourne

Group exhibitions

 2019 Linear, Powerhouse Museum, Sydney NSW
 2019 Indigenous Design, Parliament House, Canberra ACT
 2019 The Women’s Show, Vivien Anderson Gallery, Melbourne VIC
 2018 Colony: Frontier Wars, National Gallery of Victoria, Melbourne VIC
 2018 Island Welcome, Craft Victoria, Melbourne VIC
 2018 The Women’s Show, Vivien Anderson Gallery, Melbourne VIC
 2017 Defying Empire:  3rd National Indigenous Art Triennial, National Gallery of Australia, Canberra ACT
 2017 An Unorthodox flow of images, Centre for Contemporary Photography, Melbourne VIC (as part of The Melbourne Festival)
 2017 Get the picture (Melbourne 2017 Fringe Festival) Blak Dot Gallery, Brunswick, VIC
 2017 The Women’s Show, Vivien Anderson Gallery, Melbourne VIC
 2016 Sovereignty, Australian Centre for Contemporary Art (ACCA), Melbourne, VIC
 2016 Who’s Afraid of Colour? National Gallery of Victoria, Melbourne VIC

Collections
Clarke's work is included in the following galleries and collections:

National Gallery of Australia
National Gallery of Victoria
Museum Victoria
National Museum of Australia
Monash University Museum of Art
 Monash University Art Collection, Prato Campus, Tuscany, Italy
Koori Heritage Trust
Stonington Council, Melbourne, Victoria
Port Phillip Council Art Collection, Melbourne, Victoria
 Mildura Art Centre Collection, Mildura, Victoria

References 

Australian Aboriginal artists
20th-century Australian artists
20th-century Australian women artists
1961 births
Living people
21st-century Australian women
21st-century Australian people